Ingmar's Inheritance (Swedish: Ingmarsarvet) is a 1925 Swedish silent drama film directed by Gustaf Molander and starring Lars Hanson, Conrad Veidt and John Ekman. It was shot at the Råsunda Studios in Stockholm and on location in Dalarna. The film's sets were designed by the art director Vilhelm Bryde. Based on a novel by Selma Lagerlöf, it was followed by a sequel To the Orient in 1926.

Cast

References

Bibliography
Mette Hjort & Ursula Lindqvist. A Companion to Nordic Cinema''. John Wiley & Sons, 2016.

External links

1925 drama films
Swedish drama films
1920s Swedish-language films
1925 films
Swedish silent feature films
Films directed by Gustaf Molander
Films based on Swedish novels
Silent drama films
Films based on works by Selma Lagerlöf
1920s Swedish films